The Hillman Husky was a line of British passenger vehicles manufactured between 1954 and 1970 by Hillman.

Original Hillman Husky ("Mark 1")

The first (or "Mark 1") Hillman Husky, introduced in 1954, was a small estate car based on the contemporary "Mark VIII" Hillman Minx. The two-door Husky entered the range alongside an existing Minx estate car, which had a  longer wheelbase. The Husky was not a hatchback, having instead a single side-hinged rear door. While the new Mark VIII Minx DeLuxe saloon, convertible and "Californian" hardtop used a new OHV  engine, the Husky continued to use the older   sidevalve engine with single Zenith carburettor which it shared with the Minx "Special" saloon and estate. Unlike the Minx with its column change, the gear lever for the Husky was floor mounted.

There were individual seats in front and a bench seat in the rear which would fold flat to increase load area. The trim material was leathercloth. Both the heater and radio were optional extras. The car was available in blue, grey, green or sand paint (1954 colours).

42,000 of this Husky were sold until the model was replaced in 1958 (a year after the "parent" Minx was itself replaced).

The test car cost £564 including taxes.

"Audax Series" Hillman Husky

Series I
In 1958 the new "Series I" Husky was introduced. It followed the same formula as its predecessor, but was based on the new "Audax" or "Series" Hillman Minx. As before, there was also a four-door "Minx estate", and the Husky had two doors (plus the side-hinged rear door) and a shorter wheelbase (by ). It was, however,  longer than its predecessor.

Again Commer sold a panel van version of the same vehicle as the Commer Cob.

Series II
A "Series II" Husky followed in 1960 with a four-speed gearbox, slightly lowered roof, a deeper windscreen, and altered seats. The engine compression ratio was raised to 8:1 and the carburettor changed to a Zenith 30 VIG type.

The test car cost £674 including taxes.

Series III
The final iteration of the "Audax" Hillman Husky, the "Series III", made its debut in 1963, along with a face-lift for the whole Minx range (and its badge-engineered derivatives). In addition, whilst the contemporary Series V Minx got front disc brakes, the Husky continued with four-wheel drum brakes. While the 1390 cc engine continued to be used in most markets, for the USA the Husky adopted the  engine used in the contemporary Minx Series V.

From 1964 the Husky gained an all-synchromesh gearbox and changes to the clutch and suspension. Production of the Series III ended in 1965.

Hillman Imp van derivative

No further Huskies were made until a new model based on the Hillman Imp appeared in April 1967. This new Husky shared the Imp's rear-mounted  overhead camshaft engine, and had slightly better performance than the Imp, being approximately  lighter. The same engine was also adopted by the Bond 875.

Like the earlier van version, the "Imp estate" was based on the two-door car, with the roof raised by 4 inches (100 mm) to provide a large carrying space above the engine bay, giving the car a square boxy look. The unusually flat roof was reinforced with stiffening ribs and supported on the inside of the vehicle with "synthetic foam noise-deadening material".  When compared to the Commer badged panel van from which it derived, the Husky body also had extra stiffening at the rear window apertures.

Loading access was by a vertical top-hinged rear tailgate with the bottom of the opening level with the floor, making it easy to load without stooping down. Sliding windows gave ventilation and a view out from the rear bench seat. To take the increased load, this was the first Hillman derivative to have radial-ply tyres. It also had uprated rear shock absorbers and rear springs were fitted along with a strengthened rear suspension. These gave the Husky more sporty handling than the standard Imp, and looked surprising when this tall vehicle went quickly round a corner with very little roll.

Once more Commer sold a commercial version of the same car, the van version which was launched in 1965 and had the engine in low-compression form.

The last Husky was built in 1970, at which point Chrysler Europe, new owners of Rootes, engaged in a major rationalisation of their products.

Scale models
Corgi Toys; No. 206 (production 1956–1960), Hillman Husky "Mk I", approximately O scale (1:44).
Corgi Toys; No. 206M (production 1956–1959), Hillman Husky "Mk I", approximately O scale (1:44), friction drive.

References

Husky
Rear-wheel-drive vehicles
1960s cars
1970s cars
Station wagons
Cars introduced in 1954